Soviren Rural District is a rural district (dehestan) in Cham Khalaf-e Isa District, Hendijan County, Khuzestan Province, Iran. At the 2006 census, its population was 3,234, in 642 families.  The rural district has 11 villages.

References 

Rural Districts of Khuzestan Province
Hendijan County